Mariano Gómes de los Ángeles (August 2, 1799 – February 17, 1872), often known by his birth name Mariano Gómez de los Ángeles,  was a Filipino Catholic priest who was falsely accused of mutiny by the Spanish colonial authorities in the Philippines in the 19th century. He was placed in a mock trial and summarily executed in Manila along with two other clergymen collectively known as the Gomburza. Gómes was the head of the three priests and spent his life writing about abuses against Filipino priests.

Early life
Gómes was born on August 2, 1799, in the suburb of Santa Cruz, Manila. He was a tornatrás, one born of mixed Austronesian, Chinese and Spanish ancestries. His parents were Alejandro Francisco Gómez and Martina Custodio. After studying in the Colegio de San Juan de Letrán, he took theology in the University of Santo Tomás. He was a student preparing for the priesthood in the Seminary of Manila.

He was also the uncle of ilustrado nationalist and labor leader Dominador Gómez.

Assignment in Cavite
On June 2, 1824, he was designated as the head priest of Bacoor, Cavite. Aside from taking care of the spiritual necessities of the town and the church, he also taught agriculture and cottage industries. Gómes also helped in maintaining a harmonious relationship among his other priests. He fought for equal rights for native priests against the abuses of their Spanish counterparts.

Name change from Gómez to Gómes 
When Gómes took up parochial work, he discovered that he shared the name "Mariano Gómez" with a Spanish friar in Cavite and a priest from Cabuyao, Laguna.  So he changed his last name from Gómez to Gómes, with the change from the letter "z" to the letter "s" meant to reflect his being Tagalista, meaning he was proficient in the Tagalog language.

As such, his name formally became "Mariano Gómes de los Ángeles," and he signed his name "Mar Gómes de los Ángeles." This was the name he officially signed in his last will and testament.

Death
Gómes was accused of treason, sedition, and taking active part in the Cavite mutiny of 1872 and sentenced to death by garrote in a military court. He was sent to jail along with Joaquín Pardo de Tavera, Máximo Paterno, and the friars José Burgos and Jacinto Zamora.  The three friars were executed on February 17, 1872, at Bagumbayan field; and have been known since then by the acronym composed of their collective surnames – Gomburza.

Before his death, Gómes was active in the publication of the newspaper La Verdad (Spanish: "The Truth"). At the age of 72, he was the oldest of the three priests.

In popular culture
 Portrayed by Victor Aliwalas in the official music video of GMA Network's production of Lupang Hinirang in 2010.
 Portrayed by Rommel Padilla in the 2014 film, Bonifacio: Ang Unang Pangulo.

See also
Gomburza
José Burgos
Jacinto Zamora
Cavite mutiny

References

1799 births
1872 deaths
Executed Filipino people
Colegio de San Juan de Letran alumni
19th-century Filipino Roman Catholic priests
Filipino people of Chinese descent
Filipino people of Spanish descent
People executed by ligature strangulation
19th-century executions by Spain
People of Spanish colonial Philippines
University of Santo Tomas alumni
People from Santa Cruz, Manila
Burials at Paco Park